A columbarium (pl. columbaria) is a structure for the reverential and usually public storage of funerary urns, holding cremated remains of the deceased.

The term can also mean the nesting boxes of pigeons. The term comes from the Latin "columba" (dove) and, originally, solely referred to compartmentalized housing for doves and pigeons called a dovecote.

Background
Roman columbaria were often built partly or completely underground. The Columbarium of Pomponius Hylas is an ancient Roman example, rich in frescoes, decorations, and precious mosaics.

Today's columbaria can be either free standing units, or part of a mausoleum or another building. Some manufacturers produce columbaria that are built entirely off-site and brought to the cemetery by a large truck. Many modern crematoria have columbaria. Examples of these are the columbaria in Père Lachaise Cemetery in Paris and Golders Green Crematorium in London.

In other cases, columbaria are built into church structures. One example is the Cathedral of Our Lady of the Angels (Los Angeles, California), which houses a number of columbarium niches in the mausoleum built into the lower levels of the Cathedral. The construction of columbaria within churches is particularly widespread in the Czechoslovak Hussite Church. An example can be seen at the Church of St Nicolas in Old Town Square (Prague). In the Roman Catholic Church, although traditional burial is still preferred, cremation is permitted provided that the cremated remains are buried or entombed and that the cremation is not done for reasons contrary to the Catholic faith. As a result, columbaria can be found within some Catholic cemeteries.

Columbaria are often closely similar in form to traditional pagodas which function as in-situ columbaria pavillions at Buddhist temples, which from ancient times have housed cremated ashes. In Buddhism, ashes of the deceased may be placed in a columbarium (in Chinese, a naguta ("bone-receiving pagoda"); in Japanese, a nōkotsudō ("bone-receiving hall"), which can be either attached to or a part of a Buddhist temple or cemetery.  This practice allows for the family of the deceased to visit the temple in order to carry out traditional memorials and ancestor rites.

Gallery

Columbarium caves in Israel

In the Beit Guvrin area several series of large caves dug into soft rock were found. There were several theories about their original use, for ritual burial, for growing pigeons to be used for ritual sacrifice, or for raising pigeons for fertilizer production. One such cave had been covered by an earthquake close to the time of its original usage and had no signs of secondary usage; neither ashes nor pigeon droppings were found in it.

Among the archaeologic finds on Masada, a columbarium tower foundation remains.

See also
Catacomb
Cemetery
Charnel house
Crypt
Grave
Ossuary
Reliquary
Tomb

References

External links

 Photographs and commentary on ancient Roman columbaria
 Columbarium with inner ossuary
 
 

Burial monuments and structures
Death customs